Tubifera applanata is a species of slime mold in the class Myxogastria. It forms 2 to 7 cm wide "pseudoaethelia" (mass of sporangia) that are rust-red in color. They are found growing on damp, dead wood in temperate forests, including where it was first documented, which was on a log of Pinus sylvestris in Ukraine.

References

Myxogastria
Protists described in 2012